The Reed Lakes are a set of two alpine lakes in the Talkeetna Mountains of Alaska. They are the namesakes of the popular Reed Lakes hiking trail, and are notable for their turquoise color and location in a dramatic glaciated wilderness landscape.

Recreation and Access
Due to their year-round cold temperatures and the lack of road access, recreation on the lakes themselves is virtually nonexistent. However, the lakes are a popular destination for photographers, hikers, and other outdoor enthusiasts.

The Reed lakes can be accessed from the Reed Lakes trailhead on Fern Mine Road. The hike to the lakes is considered moderate, and includes approximately 1900 ft. of elevation gain to Upper Reed Lake and a scramble over a boulder field. The Reed Lakes also lie on the informal wilderness route known as the Bomber Traverse.

References

Lakes of Alaska
Lakes of Matanuska-Susitna Borough, Alaska
Articles containing video clips